is a song recorded by Japanese music duo Yoasobi from their debut EP, The Book (2021). It was released on January 18, 2020, through Sony Music Entertainment Japan. Like their previous single, the song was based on Monocon 2019-winning short story, titled Yume no Shizuku to Hoshi no Hana, written by Sōta Ishiki. The song and its based story are about a love story at a fireworks festival displayed by a high school girl and her classmate boy who would confess to her in her dream. The music video was released two days later.

The English version of "Ano Yume o Nazotte", titled "Tracing a Dream" was included on the duo's first English-language EP E-Side, scheduled for release on November 12, 2021. The ballade version, featured on the Otsuka Pharmaceutical's CalorieMate television advertisement, titled Midnight Train, was released on March 30, 2022. The song also accompanied the live action movie of its based novel Yume no Shizuku to Hoshi no Hana, which was released to the vertical theater application Smash on March 24.

Track listing

 Digital download and streaming
  – 4:02

 Digital download and streaming (ballade version)
 "Ano Yume o Nazotte" (ballade version) – 3:44

Credits and personnel

Credits adapted from The Book liner notes.

 Ayase – songwriter, producer
 Ikura – vocals
 Rockwell – guitar
 Sōta Ishiki – based story writer
 Takayuki Saitō – vocal recording
 Masahiko Fukui – mixing
 Harumotsu (Koron Koronosuke) – music video animation, cover artwork design

Charts

Weekly charts

Year-end charts

Certifications

Release history

References

External links 
 Yume no Shizuku to Hoshi no Hana on Monogatary
 English translation of Dream Drops and Star Flowers

2020 singles
2020 songs
Japanese-language songs
Songs about dreams
Sony Music Entertainment Japan singles
Yoasobi songs